Christopher Coake (born November 28, 1971) is an American fiction writer.

Background
Coake is the author of two collections of short stories,You Would Have Told Me Not To (Delphinium Books, 2020), and We're in Trouble (Harcourt, 2005), for which he was awarded the PEN/Robert W. Bingham Prize in 2006, and of the novel You Came Back (Grand Central, 2012). He was named by the 2007 issue of the British fiction journal Granta as one of the twenty "Best Young American Novelists."

Coake currently resides in Reno, Nevada, where he teaches creative writing at the University of Nevada, Reno and directs their MFA program. He received the Silver Pen Award from the Friends of the University of Nevada, Reno Libraries on November 14, 2013.

References

External links

1971 births
Living people
American short story writers